No. 9 "Attack Helicopter" Squadron is a squadron of the Sri Lanka Air Force. It currently operates the air force's fleet of Attack Helicopter of Mil Mi-24s, Mil Mi-35s and Mi-17Sh s from SLAF Hingurakgoda for Close Air Support. The squadron is tasked with close air support/battlefield air interdiction, air interdiction, maritime air operations, armed escort missions and air defence operations.

In March 2009, the squadron was presented with the President’s Colours.

History

At its formation the squadron had five pilots, 26 engineering crew. In 1996 the leased aircraft were returned and new ones were bought. In 2000 Mi-35Ps were added to the fleet. The Squadron currently operates a mix of Mi-24/-35P and Mi-24V/-35 versions. They have recently been upgraded with modern Israeli FLIR and electronic warfare systems. Five were upgraded to intercept aircraft by adding radar, fully functional helmet mounted target tracking systems, and AAMs. Seven Mi-24 List of Sri Lanka Air Force aircraft losses during the Sri Lankan Civil War, have been destroyed to LTTE MANPADs& anti aircraft guns, and another two lost in attacks on airbases, with one heavily damaged but later returned to service. 

In March 2009, the squadron was presented with the President’s Colours.

Aircraft operated

Year of introduction
Mil Mi-24 - 1995
Mil Mi-35 - 2000
Mil Mi-17Sh - 2013

Notable members
 Wing Commander Tyronne Silvapulle - Parama Weera Vibhushanaya recipient 
 Group Captain Jagath Rodrigo - First Commanding Officer- 24.11.95 to 23.10.2000 
 Wing Commander Thilina Kaluarachchi, WWV, RWP and bar, RSP and bar  - First Instructor Pilot, No. 9 Attack Helicopter Squadron.  
  Wing Commander Wanigasooriya.
  Squadron Leader Channa Dissanayake
  Squadron Leader Priyamal Fernando
  Squadron Leader Deshapriya Silva
  Squadron Leader Nipuna Thanippuliarachchi
  Squadron Leader TN Deen 
  Squadron Leader Amal Wahid - (1999 -2009) - (WWV, RWP, 5BAR-RSP). 
  Squadron Leader Anurudha Mallasekare 
  Squadron Leader Danesh Gunasekara 
  Squadron Leader Bandu Edirisinghe.
  Squadron Leader Lasantha Kodithuakku 
  Flying Officer Atiq 
  Flying Officer Ashrof Dole - First Volunteer and youngest Attack Helicopter Pilot to serve.
  Flying Officer Nuwan Kadurugamuwa - First Forward Supply Officer.
  Wing Commander MDAP Payoe RSP, Commanding Officer- 24.10.2000 to 13.12.2004
  Wing Commander RMPRS Dharmawardena RWP, RSP, Commanding Officer- 14.12.2004 to 26.12.2006
  Wing Commander HSS Thuyacontha- Commanding officer- 26.12.2006 to 22.09.2009
  Wing Commander IMYA Bandara RSP- Commanding Officer- 22.09.2009 to 06.07.2010
  Wing Commander Thushara Weeraratne - Commanding Officer - 06.07.2010 to 31.12.2013
  Group Captain IMYA Bandara RSP - Commanding Officer - 01.01.2014 to 01.03.2014
  Wing Commander Deshapriya Silva - Commanding Officer - 02.03.2014 to 01.01.2015
  Group Captain Channa Dissanayake - Commanding Officer - 01.01.2015 to date. 

Officer Commanding Maintenance
 Wing Commander Nilantha Udukala - First Officer Commanding Maintenance
 Wing Commander Palitha Satharasinghe
 Wing Commander Malinda Perera
 Squadron Leader Sanjaya Thotahewage
 Squadron Leader Titus Pieris 
 Squadron Leader Chandana Liyanage
 Squadron Leader Dushan Wijesinghe
 Squadron Leader Bandara Sumanasekera
 Squadron Leader Saluka Liyanagunawardana 
 Squadron Leader Lasantha Gunasinghe

References

Restructure of Flying Squadrons

External links
Sri Lanka Air Force Base Hingurakgoda
www.scramble.nl
Ruling the sky 
Spirit of 'The Hinds'! 

Military units and formations established in 1995
9